Deinococcus indicus is a species of arsenic-resistant bacterium. It is Gram-negative, rod-shaped, non-motile, non-sporulating and red-pigmented, with type strain Wt/1aT (=MTCC 4913T =DSM 15307T).

References

Further reading

External links
LPSN

Type strain of Deinococcus indicus at BacDive -  the Bacterial Diversity Metadatabase

Deinococcales
Bacteria described in 2004